Amboy is a census-designated place (CDP) in Clark County, Washington, United States. The population was 1,838 at the 2020 census, up from 1,608 at the 2010 census. It is located 33 miles northeast of Vancouver which is part of the Portland-Vancouver metropolitan area.

Geography
Washington State Route 503 passes through the community, leading southwest  to Lewisville and northeast  to Yale.

Demographics
As of the census of 2000, there were 2,085 people, 633 households, and 529 families residing in the CDP. The population density was 145.7 people per square mile (56.3/km2). There were 658 housing units at an average density of 46.0/sq mi (17.8/km2). The racial makeup of the CDP was 95.78% White, 0.43% African American, 1.25% Native American, 0.29% Asian, 0.19% Pacific Islander, 0.77% from other races, and 1.29% from two or more races. Hispanic or Latino of any race were 1.73% of the population. 14.2% were of German, 14.1% Finnish, 12.6% American, 10.6% Irish, 9.5% English and 5.0% Norwegian ancestry according to Census 2000.

There were 633 households, out of which 45.2% had children under the age of 18 living with them, 74.1% were married couples living together, 5.5% had a female householder with no husband present, and 16.3% were non-families. 12.5% of all households were made up of individuals, and 4.3% had someone living alone who was 65 years of age or older. The average household size was 3.29 and the average family size was 3.61.

In the CDP, the age distribution of the population shows 36.3% under the age of 18, 7.3% from 18 to 24, 28.1% from 25 to 44, 20.8% from 45 to 64, and 7.5% who were 65 years of age or older. The median age was 31 years. For every 100 females, there were 99.7 males. For every 100 females age 18 and over, there were 103.4 males.

The median income for a household in the CDP was $50,896, and the median income for a family was $52,170. Males had a median income of $41,535 versus $22,128 for females. The per capita income for the CDP was $16,973. About 6.5% of families and 6.5% of the population were below the poverty line, including 9.2% of those under age 18 and none of those age 65 or over.

History

Amboy was named by Amos M. Ball, who settled in the area in 1879 and whose family operated the Post Office after it was established in 1880. According to some sources, there were several settlers in the area, including Ball, with the initials A.M.B., who referred to themselves as the A.M. Boys. Reportedly, Ball named the town after that group. Another story states that the town was named after Ball's son, referred to by locals as the A.M. Boy.

A historical church known as the Amboy United Brethren Church was built in 1910 and converted into a museum in 2000.

References

External links

 Amboy Business, Community & Events

Census-designated places in Clark County, Washington
Census-designated places in Washington (state)